Daniel  de  la  Vega (30 June 1892 –  29 July 1971) was a Chilean journalist, poet, playwright, chronicler, and novelist.

De la Vega was born in Quilpué (now part of Greater Valparaiso) into an educated family who instilled in him a love of literature.  He graduated from the lyceum in Quilpué.  The poetry in his first book, El calor del Terruño (1912), has been called "light and delicate" with an "arresting mysticism".

He was friends with poet and playwright Víctor Domingo Silva.  In 1953, he received the 12th Chilean National Prize in Literature for his work in both journalism and theater. His primary contributions were published originally in periodicals, notably in the column "Hoy" ("Today") in Ultimas Noticias, but he put together over forty books as well.  De  la  Vega died in Santiago de Chile.

Works
El calor de terruño 1912, several editions,
Reino de angustias, poemas 1939
El romancero 1934
La luna enemiga, novela 1920
La quintrala 1936

Notes

1892 births
1971 deaths
Chilean journalists
Male journalists
Chilean male poets
Chilean male dramatists and playwrights
Chilean non-fiction writers
Chilean male novelists
Chilean columnists
People from Quilpué
National Prize for Literature (Chile) winners
20th-century Chilean poets
20th-century Chilean novelists
20th-century Chilean dramatists and playwrights
20th-century Chilean male writers
20th-century journalists